Robert Grady may refer to:

 W. Robert Grady (born 1950), American member of the North Carolina General Assembly
 Robert E. Grady (born 1959), American venture capitalist and investment banker
 Robert B. Grady (1943–2014), software development engineer